Dyschirius aeneo is a species of ground beetle in the subfamily Scaritinae. It was described by Boheman in 1849.

References

aeneo
Beetles described in 1849